Women's doubles at the 1999 Pan American Games was won by Joana Cortez and Vanessa Menga of Brazil.

Medalists

Draw

Final rounds

Women's doubles